Sedan station (French: Gare de Sedan) is a railway station serving the town of Sedan, Ardennes department in northeastern France. It is situated on the Mohon–Thionville railway. The station is served by regional trains towards Charleville-Mézières, Reims and Longwy, and by high-speed trains towards Paris.

See also 

 List of SNCF stations in Grand Est

References

Railway stations in Ardennes (department)